Jan Janský (3 April 1873 in Smíchov, now Prague – 8 September 1921 in Černošice, near Prague) was a Czech serologist, neurologist and psychiatrist. He is credited with the classification of blood into four types (I, II, III, IV).

Janský studied medicine at Charles University in Prague. From 1899, he worked in the Psychiatric Clinic in Prague. In 1914, he was named professor. During World War I Janský served two years as a doctor at the front until a heart attack disabled him. After the war he worked as a neuropsychiatrist in a military Hospital (Vojenská nemocnice). He had angina pectoralis and died of ischaemic heart disease.

Janský was also a proponent of voluntary blood donations.

Classification

Through his psychiatric research, Janský tried to find a correlation between mental diseases and blood diseases. He found no such correlation existed and published a study, Hematologická studie u psychotiků (1907, Hematological study of psychotics), in which he classified blood into four groups, I, II, III, and IV. (At the time, Janský was unaware of the work of Karl Landsteiner, whose discovery of the A, B, and O blood types earned him the Nobel Prize in Physiology or Medicine in 1930.) At the time Janský's discovery passed almost unnoticed. In 1921 an American medical commission acknowledged Janský's classification. A similar classification was described by William Lorenzo Moss, except the I and IV of Moss were the opposite to that of Janský's, leading to confusion in blood transfusion until the use of A, B and O became standard.

Legacy
 Frequent voluntary blood donors in the Czech Republic and Slovakia are awarded with Janský medal (Janského plaketa).
 The Secret of Blood, a 1953 Czechoslovak film about his discovery.

References

External links
 Biography (in Czech)

Czech neurologists
Serologists
Charles University alumni
Academic staff of Charles University
1873 births
1921 deaths
Czech psychiatrists
Scientists from Prague
Deaths from coronary artery disease
Psychiatrists from the Austro-Hungarian Empire
Czechoslovak psychiatrists